Wanlessia is a genus of Asian jumping spiders that was first described by D. P. Wijesinghe in 1992.  it contains two species, both endemic to eastern Asia: W. denticulata and W. sedgwicki. It is related to Portia, and is the only member of the subfamily Spartaeinae with well-developed palpal conductors. Both species only have descriptions for males. It is named in honor of arachnologist Fred R. Wanless, who described more than a dozen salticid genera from 1970 to 1990.

Both the carapace and legs are yellowish-brown, though the carapace has irregular black markings and a lighter area around the fovea. The opisthosoma is yellow to white with similar markings near the rear, and is covered with amber-grey hairs. The legs have black rings on some segments.

References

External links
 Salticidae.org: Diagnostic drawings of W. denticulata

Salticidae
Salticidae genera
Spiders of Asia